The Boys Club is a 1996 Canadian  crime drama thriller film directed by John Fawcett, written by Doug Smith (story) and Peter Wellington (writer), and starring Chris Penn, Devon Sawa, Dominic Zamprogna, and Stuart Stone. It was released theatrically  by Alliance Films, on VHS in Canada by Alliance Video and the United States by A-Pix Entertainment in the United Kingdom and Ireland on VHS by High Fliers Films and Australia and New Zealand on VHS by Home Cinema Group, on Laserdisc in the United States by Image Entertainment and on DVD in the United States in 1998 by Simitar Entertainment and in 2003 by Ardustry Home Entertainment. In 2013, it was released by Echo Bridge Home Entertainment on DVD, and in 2017 by FilmRise digitally on Amazon Prime. It currently is not available on Blu-ray or Ultra HD Blu-ray. The film has aired in the mid 1990's on television in the USA on Pay-Per-View and Turner Classic Movies and in Canada, on Cinépop.

Plot
Three teenage boys in small-town Southern Ontario are thrilled when Luke Cooper, a mysterious American fugitive with a gunshot wound to his leg, decides to crash their secret hideout. Luke tells them that he is a cop on the run from corrupt colleagues, and swears them to silence. As he recuperates, he becomes their buddy and confidant. By the time the boys realize that Luke is not who he pretends to be, they are too deeply involved.

Cast

Soundtrack
"Harnessed in Slums", Archers of Loaf
"Universe", Eric's Trip
"Failed You", The Pasties
"Old Enough", Crash Vegas
"Devil", Drugstore
"Disease", Sister Machine Gun
"Coconut Cream", The Tragically Hip
"Jesus", Vowel Movement
"Misogyny", Rusty
"Too Easy", Wagbeard
"Gun Pointed", Taste of Joy
"Monkeysucker", The Killjoys
"Everything", The Killjoys
"Morphine", Moist
"You Shine Bright", Crash Vegas
"My Favorite Martian", The Doughboys
"The Letter", Bif Naked
"Over Your Shoulder", Motörhead
"Moment", Crawl
"Neighborhood Villains", The Doughboys
"The Secret", 54-40

Awards and nominations
The film garnered five Genie Award nominations at the 17th Genie Awards in 1996:
Best Director (John Fawcett)
Best Actor (Chris Penn)
Best Art Direction/Production Design (Taavo Soodor)
Best Editing (Susan Maggi)
Best Screenplay (Doug Smith) and (Peter Wellington (director))

External links
 
 
 

1996 films
1996 crime drama films
1996 crime thriller films
1996 directorial debut films
1990s Canadian films
1990s coming-of-age drama films
1990s English-language films
1990s teen drama films
1990s thriller drama films
Canadian coming-of-age drama films
Canadian crime drama films
Canadian crime thriller films
Canadian teen drama films
Canadian thriller drama films
English-language Canadian films
Films directed by John Fawcett
Films set in Ontario
Teen crime films
Teen thriller films